Mangrove Cay is one of the districts of the Bahamas, on Andros Island. Its capital is Moxey Town in the north east corner of the island.

There are 3 schools: Victoria Point Preschool, Burnt Rock Primary, and Mangrove Cay High School.

The census of population 2010-05-03 shows a population of 892 for the district, of which 420 were in Moxey Town (Little Harbour).

References

Further reading

Districts of the Bahamas
Islands of the Bahamas
Andros, Bahamas